The following is a partial list of Lexmark products  currently sold under the Lexmark brand.

Printers

Laser printers
suffixes:a: auto feed - 
d: duplex print				
e: eSF support (embedded apps)
n: network (letter omitted when 'e' is present)						
h: hard disk drive (omitted in series where 100% of models include it)
t: extra paper tray
f: staple finisher
p: staple and hole punch finisher	
x: high-capacity paper tray
m: mailbox
s: offset stacker
w: wireless

Current Line:

Monochrome printers
 Lexmark MS312dn
 Lexmark MS315dn
 Lexmark MS410dn
 Lexmark MS415dn
 Lexmark MS510dn
 Lexmark MS610de
 Lexmark MS610dn
 Lexmark MS610dte
 Lexmark MS610dtn
 Lexmark MS710dn
 Lexmark MS711dn
 Lexmark MS810de
 Lexmark MS810dn
 Lexmark MS810dtn
 Lexmark MS810n
 Lexmark MS811dn
 Lexmark MS811dtn
 Lexmark MS811n
 Lexmark MS812de
 Lexmark MS812dn
 Lexmark MS812dtn
 Lexmark MS911de

Color Printers
 Lexmark CS310dn
 Lexmark CS310n
 Lexmark CS410dn
 Lexmark CS410dtn
 Lexmark CS410n
 Lexmark CS510de
 Lexmark CS510dte
 Lexmark C746dn
 Lexmark C746dtn
 Lexmark C746n
 Lexmark C748de
 Lexmark C748dte
 Lexmark C748e
 Lexmark C792de
 Lexmark C792dhe
 Lexmark C792dte
 Lexmark C792e
 Lexmark C925de
 Lexmark C925dte
 Lexmark C950de
 Lexmark C923de
 Lexmark C924de
 
Monochrome Multifunction Products
 Lexmark MX310dn
 Lexmark MX410de
 Lexmark MX510de
 Lexmark MX511de
 Lexmark MX511dhe
 Lexmark MX511dte
 Lexmark MX610de
 Lexmark MX611de
 Lexmark MX611dfe
 Lexmark MX611dhe
 Lexmark MX611dte
 Lexmark MX710de
 Lexmark MX710dhe
 Lexmark MX711de
 Lexmark MX711dhe
 Lexmark MX711dthe
 Lexmark MX810de
 Lexmark MX810dfe
 Lexmark MX810dme
 Lexmark MX810dpe
 Lexmark MX810dte
 Lexmark MX810dtfe
 Lexmark MX810dtme
 Lexmark MX810dtpe
 Lexmark MX810dxe
 Lexmark MX810dxfe
 Lexmark MX810dxme
 Lexmark MX810dxpe
 Lexmark MX811de
 Lexmark MX811dfe
 Lexmark MX811dme
 Lexmark MX811dpe
 Lexmark MX811dte
 Lexmark MX811dtfe
 Lexmark MX811dtme
 Lexmark MX811dtpe
 Lexmark MX811dxe
 Lexmark MX811dxfe
 Lexmark MX811dxme
 Lexmark MX811dxpe
 Lexmark MX812de
 Lexmark MX812dfe
 Lexmark MX812dme
 Lexmark MX812dpe
 Lexmark MX812dte
 Lexmark MX812dtfe
 Lexmark MX812dtme
 Lexmark MX812dtpe
 Lexmark MX812dxe
 Lexmark MX812dxfe
 Lexmark MX812dxme
 Lexmark MX812dxpe
 Lexmark MX910de
 Lexmark MX911dte
 Lexmark MX912dxe

Color Multifunction Products
 Lexmark CX310dn
 Lexmark CX310n
 Lexmark CX410de
 Lexmark CX410dte
 Lexmark CX410e
 Lexmark CX510de
 Lexmark CX510dhe
 Lexmark CX510dthe
 Lexmark MC2325
 Lexmark MC2425
 Lexmark MC2525
 Lexmark MC2640
 Lexmark MC3224
 Lexmark MC3326
Lexmark MC3426adw
 Lexmark X746de
 Lexmark X748de
 Lexmark X748dte
 Lexmark X792de
 Lexmark X792dte
 Lexmark X792dtfe
 Lexmark X792dtme
 Lexmark X792dtpe
 Lexmark X792dtse
 Lexmark X925de
 Lexmark X950de
 Lexmark X952dte
 Lexmark X954dhe

Other printers

Dot Matrix Printers
 Lexmark Forms Printer 2580+
 Lexmark Forms Printer 2580n+
 Lexmark Forms Printer 2581+
 Lexmark Forms Printer 2581n+
 Lexmark Forms Printer 2590+
 Lexmark Forms Printer 2590n+
 Lexmark Forms Printer 2591+
 Lexmark Forms Printer 2591n+

Other products
 Lexmark Document Portal
 Lexmark Document Producer
 Lexmark Forms Card
 Lexmark Forms Composer

References

Sources
http://www.lexmark.com/common/epg/regions.shtml

Lists of computer hardware
Lists of products
Computing-related lists
Products by individual company
Products